Araeothrips is a genus of thrips in the family Phlaeothripidae.

Species
 Araeothrips duibongensis
 Araeothrips longisetis
 Araeothrips vamana

References

Phlaeothripidae
Thrips
Thrips genera